Yaul, also known as Ulwa, is a severely endangered Keram language of Papua New Guinea. It is spoken fluently by fewer than 700 people and semi-fluently by around 1,250 people in four villages of the Angoram District of the East Sepik Province: Manu, Maruat, Dimiri, and Yaul.

According to Barlow (2018), speakers in Maruat, Dimiri, and Yaul villages speak similar versions of Ulwa, while those in Manu speak a considerably different version. Thus, he postulates that there are two different dialects of Ulwa.

References

Sources
 
 Barlow, Russell. 2023. A grammar of Ulwa (Papua New Guinea). (Comprehensive Grammar Library). Berlin: Language Science Press.

External links 
 Language materials from the Ulwa [yla] language of East Sepik recorded by Russell Barlow and archived with Kaipuleohone
 Paradisec has two collections with Yaul materials, including Don Laycock's DL2 collection, and JM1

Languages of East Sepik Province
Mongol–Langam languages